Chemical cycling describes systems of repeated circulation of chemicals between other compounds, states and materials, and back to their original state, that occurs in space, and on many objects in space including the Earth. Active chemical cycling is known to occur in stars, many planets and natural satellites.

Chemical cycling plays a large role in sustaining planetary atmospheres, liquids and biological processes and can greatly influence weather and climate. Some chemical cycles release renewable energy, others may give rise to complex chemical reactions, organic compounds and prebiotic chemistry. On terrestrial bodies such as the Earth, chemical cycles involving the lithosphere are known as geochemical cycles. Ongoing geochemical cycles are one of the main attributes of geologically active worlds. A chemical cycle involving a biosphere is known as a biogeochemical cycle.

The Sun, other stars and star systems 
In most hydrogen-fusing stars, including the Sun, a chemical cycle involved in stellar nucleosynthesis occurs which is known as a carbon-nitrogen-oxygen or (CNO cycle). In addition to this cycle, stars also have a helium cycle. Various cycles involving gas and dust have been found to occur in galaxies.

Venus 
The majority of known chemical cycles on Venus involve its dense atmosphere and compounds of carbon and sulphur, the most significant being a strong carbon dioxide cycle. The lack of a complete carbon cycle including a geochemical carbon cycle, for example, is thought to be a cause of its runaway greenhouse effect, due to the lack of a substantial carbon sink. Sulphur cycles including sulphur oxide cycles also occur, sulphur oxide in the upper atmosphere and results in the presence of sulfuric acid in turn returns to oxides through photolysis. Indications also suggest an ozone cycle on Venus similar to that of Earth's.

Earth 

A number of different types of chemical cycles geochemical cycles occur on Earth. Biogeochemical cycles play an important role in sustaining the biosphere.
Notable active chemical cycles on Earth include:

 Carbon cycle – consisting of an atmospheric carbon cycle (and carbon dioxide cycle), terrestrial biological carbon cycle, oceanic carbon cycle and geological carbon cycle
 Nitrogen cycle – which converts nitrogen between its forms through  fixation, ammonification, nitrification, and denitrification
 Oxygen cycle and Ozone–oxygen cycle – a biogeochemical cycle  of circulating oxygen between the atmosphere, biosphere (the global sum of all ecosystems), and the lithosphere
 Ozone-oxygen cycle – continually regenerates ozone in the atmosphere and converts ultraviolet radiation (UV) into heat
 Water cycle – moves water continuously on, above and below the surface shifting between states of liquid, solution, ice and vapour
 Methane cycle – moves methane between geological and biogeochemical sources and reactions in the atmosphere
 Hydrogen cycle – a biogeochemical cycle brought about by a combination of biological and abiological processes
 Phosphorus cycle – the movement of phosphorus through the lithosphere, hydrosphere, and biosphere
 Sulfur cycle – a biogeochemical process resulting form the mineralization of organic sulfur, oxidation, reduction and incorporation into organic compounds
 Carbonate–silicate cycle transforms silicate rocks to carbonate rocks by weathering and sedimentation and transforms carbonate rocks back into silicates by metamorphism and magmatism.
 Rock cycle – switches rock between its three forms: sedimentary, metamorphic, and igneous
 Mercury cycle – a biogeochemical process in which naturally occurring mercury is bioaccumulated before recombining with sulfur and returning to geological sources as sediments

Other chemical cycles include hydrogen peroxide.

Mars 

Recent evidence suggests that similar chemical cycles to Earth's occur on a lesser scale on Mars, facilitated by the thin atmosphere, including carbon dioxide (and possibly carbon), water, sulphur, methane, oxygen, ozone, and nitrogen cycles. Many studies point to significantly more active chemical cycles on Mars in the past, however the faint young Sun paradox has proved problematic in determining chemical cycles involved in early climate models of the planet.

Jupiter 

Jupiter, like all the gas giants, has an atmospheric methane cycle. Recent studies indicate a hydrological cycle of water-ammonia vastly different to the type operating on terrestrial planets like Earth and also a cycle of hydrogen sulfide.

Significant chemical cycles exist on Jupiter's moons. Recent evidence points to Europa possessing several active cycles, most notably a water cycle. Other studies suggest an oxygen and radiation induced carbon dioxide cycle. Io and Europa, appear to have radiolytic sulphur cycles involving their lithospheres. In addition, Europa is thought to have a sulfur dioxide cycle. In addition, the Io plasma torus contributes to a sulphur cycle on Jupiter and Ganymede. Studies also imply active oxygen cycles on Ganymede and oxygen and radiolytic carbon dioxide cycles on Callisto.

Saturn 

In addition to Saturn's methane cycle some studies suggest an ammonia cycle induced by photolysis similar to Jupiter's.

The cycles of its moons are of particular interest. Observations by Cassini–Huygens of Titan's atmosphere and interactions with its liquid mantle give rise to several active chemical cycles including a methane, hydrocarbon, hydrogen, and carbon cycles. Enceladus has an active hydrological, silicate and possibly a nitrogen cycle.

Uranus 
Uranus has an active methane cycle. Methane is converted to hydrocarbons through photolysis which condenses and as they are heated, release methane which rises to the upper atmosphere.

Studies by Grundy et al. (2006) indicate active carbon cycles operates on Titania, Umbriel and Ariel and Oberon through the ongoing sublimation and deposition of carbon dioxide, though some is lost to space over long periods of time.

Neptune 
Neptune's internal heat and convection drives cycles of methane, carbon, and a combination of other volatiles within Triton's lithosphere.

Models predicted the presence of seasonal nitrogen cycles on the moon Triton, however this has not been supported by observations to date.

Pluto-Charon system 
Models predict a seasonal nitrogen cycle on Pluto and observations by New Horizons appear to support this.

References 

Biogeochemical cycle
Geochemistry
Planetary science